Lìxià is the 7th solar term according to the traditional Chinese lunisolar calendar, which divides a year into 24 solar terms (節氣). 

It begins when the Sun reaches the celestial longitude of 45° and ends when it reaches the longitude of 60°. It more often refers in particular to the day when the Sun is exactly at the celestial longitude of 45°. In the Gregorian calendar, it usually begins around May 5 and ends around May 21.

Lixia signifies the beginning of summer in East Asian cultures.

Date and time

References

07
Summer